Zemacies torticostata is an extinct species of sea snail, a marine gastropod mollusk in the family Borsoniidae.

Description
The length of the shell attains 13 mm, its width 4 mm.

(Original description) The specimens of this small shell are quite imperfect; The spire is long and slender and contains six convex whorls showing in the best specimen. The suture is impressed with a well-marked border anteriorly. The whorls show eighteen radial ridges, which extend from suture to suture and are strongly twisted forward at the anterior end. A series of very fine spiral striae cover all parts of the whorls. The aperture is not preserved in any of the specimens, but the fairly distinct growth lines show that the anal notch was broad and rounded.

Distribution
This extinct marine species is endemic to New Zealand and was found in Middle Eocene strata.

References

 Maxwell, P.A. (2009). Cenozoic Mollusca. pp. 232–254 in Gordon, D.P. (ed.) New Zealand inventory of biodiversity. Volume one. Kingdom Animalia: Radiata, Lophotrochozoa, Deuterostomia. Canterbury University Press, Christchurch.

torticostata
Gastropods of New Zealand
Gastropods described in 1919